Girls Quest is an organization for girls founded in 1936 by  Ruth Uarda Zirkle Kauth. The organization was created to enrich the lives of teen girls and to help them become active members of their communities and to reach their full potential. The girls enjoy outdoor education experiences, leadership training and they have year-round mentors. Girls Quest has helped over 300 disadvantaged girls from the New York and Catskills region for over 70 years. The girls ages are 8-17, and they participate in educational experiences that promote literacy, ecological awareness, teamwork, peer support and role-modeling, creative  expression, problem solving, and leadership.

History 
Girls Quest was first founded as Girls’ Vacation Fund in 1936 by Ruth Uarda Zirkle Kauth, who was a social worker at the Henry Street Settlement House. Ruth led a group of women that offered recreation and health programs for the sisters of boys who attended the Boys Athletic League's summer programs, which her husband, Willard L. Kauth, co-founded. The first camp was named Camp Manitou and opened in 1936 in Central Valley, New York. It offered a two-week vacation for over 100 girls of the age 8 to 13.

The name of the organization changed to Girls Quest in July 2005 to better reflect the approach to the development of young women and girls. The focus of Girls Quest has matured and has developed a new mission: to nurture girls from low-income families in New York to help them achieve their full potential and become active members of their communities by building academic and social competence. They continue to build up the lives of young women to create strong, empowering, industrious and caring inhabitants of their communities.

Programs 
The organization has three different programs which the young women can be involved in. The Summer Experiential Education and Development (SEED) Program was the entry for all girls who joined Girls Quest.

 Over 300 girls attended the two-week program at the summer site in East Windham, New York, called Camp Oh-Neh-Tah. The goal of the summer camp was to lessen the learning gap by offering activities that stimulate the emotional and learning development of the girls in a safe environment while still challenging the girls to strive to their full potential. SEED merged reading, writing and comprehension into their programs which included: arts and crafts, daily journal writing, leisure reading, performing arts and even ecology work. Girls Quest philosophy is to build self-esteem, create greater acceptance of others and persuade teamwork.

Another goal was to encourage young girls to step beyond the familiar with confidence. This gives them the motivation to seek their future with optimism and the skills to excel and succeed. Camp Oh-Neh-Tah, which means "Silver Hemlock", was located about 150 miles northwest of New York City. In each session it suited around 100 girls. The campground was 464 acres and surrounded by 10,000 acres of state forest. It included hiking trails, a lake for swimming and boating, sport fields, classrooms, a library, an art studio, health center, a staff lounge, animal barn, garden, and a rope course.

In 2009 Girls Quest either met or surpassed their goals for SEED: 
83% had an increase in interest in reading
84% increased in interest in writing
78% read 1-6 books while attending SEED
89% increased ability to communicate and interact with peers
65% wrote in their journals 1-6 times a week

Camp Oh-Neh-Tah closed in 2013.

The second program was the Mentor Program. The program provides role models for the girls and a support system to motivate the girls who are ready to find themselves and explore their community. The program launched in 2001 to provide teenage girls with year-round support systems during challenging years of being a teen. Any girl who attended SEED was eligible to partake in the Mentor Program. The women who apply to be a mentor are screened carefully and then matched by the staff to the most compatible girl. It is a year-long commitment between the mentor and the mentee. The mentor and mentee then participate in fun and enriching activities in the New York area twice a month. The many goals of the Mentor Program include: Increase girls' sense of self-worth, to improve girls' perspective toward education, to help girls' develop and define their short-term and long-term goals, to encourage social awareness through community service projects, and to build positive relationships and support networks with adults and peers.

The last program is the Teen Leadership Program. The program is created to direct the needs of girls in their evolution from girls to active members in their communities. Teen Leadership helps develop positive attitudes and relationships with adults and peer and helps them develop socially and succeed academically. It also helps develop skills to become leaders in their communities. The program keeps teens connected and nurtured during the ages of 15 to 17, keeping them on track with school and keeping them developing to their fullest potential. Girls from the age 15 and up engage in educational, cultural and leadership projects throughout the year. The Teen Leaders commit to a three-year, year-round program which included being a peer leader at SEED at Camp Oh-Neh-Tah. The girls receive training in leadership, conflict resolution, and behavior modeling during academic year to be prepared for summer.

References

External links
 

Youth organizations based in New York (state)